Yehuda Deri is a rabbi, member of the Chief Rabbinical Council of Israel, and the Chief Rabbi of Beersheba since 1997. In 2013, he was a candidate for Chief Rabbi of Israel. He was also a past candidate for Chief Rabbi for Jerusalem and for Tel Aviv. He is a brother of Aryeh Deri.

See also
 Shlomo Deri

References

Sephardic Haredi rabbis in Israel

Living people
Year of birth missing (living people)
Rabbis in Beersheba
Deri family